Mariaan de Swardt and David Adams defeated Serena Williams and Max Mirnyi in the final, 6–4, 4–6, 7–6(7–5) to win the mixed doubles tennis title at the 1999 Australian Open.

Venus Williams and Justin Gimelstob were the defending champions, but did not compete that year.

One of the surprises of this tournament was that over half of the seeds lost in the first round, and none of the seeds made it past the second round.

Seeds

Draw

Finals

Top half

Bottom half

References
 1999 Australian Open – Doubles draws and results at the International Tennis Federation

Mixed Doubles
Australian Open (tennis) by year – Mixed doubles